The following lists events that happened in 1934 in El Salvador.

Incumbents
President: Maximiliano Hernández Martínez (until 28 August), Andrés Ignacio Menéndez (starting 28 August)
Vice President: Vacant

Events

June
 19 June – Central Reserve Bank of El Salvador was established.

August
 28 August – Maximiliano Hernández Martínez resigned as President in order to run in the 1935 Salvadoran presidential election. Andrés Ignacio Menéndez became Provisional President.

References

 
El Salvador
1930s in El Salvador
Years of the 20th century in El Salvador
El Salvador